Luis Satorra (born 13 September 1969) is a French former professional football player and manager. As a player, he was a defender.

Honours 
Sedan

 Coupe de France runner-up: 1998–99

Notes

References 

1969 births
Living people
Footballers from Rennes
French footballers
Association football defenders
Montpellier HSC players
Stade Briochin players
CS Sedan Ardennes players
Amiens SC players

French Division 4 (1978–1993) players
French Division 3 (1971–1993) players
Ligue 2 players
Championnat National players
Ligue 1 players
Championnat National 3 players
French football managers